Royal Air Force Blakehill Farm or more simply RAF Blakehill Farm is a former Royal Air Force station southwest of Cricklade in Wiltshire, England, operational between 1944 and 1952.

History
The station was originally allocated to the United States Army Air Forces Ninth Air Force but not used.  It opened in 1944 and was home for transport aircraft of No. 46 Group RAF Transport Command.  In 1948 the airfield was a satellite of RAF South Cerney, and was used by training aircraft until the airfield closed in 1952 and was returned to agricultural use.  The site is now a Wiltshire Wildlife Trust nature reserve.

Units and aircraft

The following units were also here at some point:
 No. 18 Terminal Staging Post
 No. 19 Terminal Staging Post
 No. 92 (Forward) Staging Post
 No. 93 (Forward) Staging Post
 No. 123 (Major) Staging Post
 No. 2748 Squadron RAF Regiment
 No. 2835 Squadron RAF Regiment

Post-war intelligence role
In 1967, GCHQ set up an "experimental radio station", a secret research facility, on the site. The site was still active in some capacity until the mid-1990s, and traces of the former communications mast bases can still be seen on aerial photographs. It is possible that this tower was a relic of the wartime Chain Home network, although its lattice pattern is of another type. The tower was demolished on 26 January 2000.

See also
List of former Royal Air Force stations

References
Citations

Bibliography

External links

Povey, Vince (2018) http://www.rafblakehillfarm.co.uk/ - From War To Wildlife - the complete history of the airfield

 
 

Blakehill Farm
Wiltshire Wildlife Trust reserves
Cricklade